Mehdi Chahiri (born 25 July 1996) is a French professional footballer who plays as a midfielder for Ligue 2 club Paris FC on loan from Strasbourg.

Career
Chahiri transferred from USL Dunkerque to fellow Championnat National side Red Star in 2019. He had a breakout campaign with Red Star during the 2019–20 Championnat National season, scoring 13 goals in 19 matches in all competitions in the first half of the season. His great form with Red Star earned him a transfer to Strasbourg in Ligue 1, with whom he signed a four and a half year contract on 31 January 2020. He returned to Red Star on loan for the rest of the season.

Chahiri marked his Strasbourg and Ligue 1 debut against FC Lorient on 23 August 2020 with a goal but his side fell to a 1–3 defeat.

On 31 August 2021, he joined Caen on loan. On 21 June 2022, Chahiri moved on loan to Paris FC.

Personal life
Born in France, Chahiri is of Moroccan descent.

Career statistics

References

External links
 
 

1996 births
French sportspeople of Moroccan descent
Living people
French footballers
Association football midfielders
USL Dunkerque players
RC Strasbourg Alsace players
Red Star F.C. players
Stade Malherbe Caen players
Paris FC players
Ligue 1 players
Ligue 2 players
Championnat National players
Championnat National 2 players
Championnat National 3 players